Albert Arthur Humbles (born 9 May 1910, died 3 July 1997), subsequently known as Alan Alain Holt and Allan Holt, was an English cyclist who set the world endurance cycling record by covering  during the calendar year of 1932. He broke the previous best mark that had stood since Marcel Planes completed  in 1911 in response to Cycling magazine's 'Century Competition'. In 1933, Humbles entered the Golden Book of Cycling as the greatest long-distance rider in the world.

Personal life
Humbles was born in Dalston, London, the sixth of seven children of William Humbles (1881-1917) and Blanche Maude Amelia Humbles (née Illett; 1884-1974). By 1914, his parents had separated and he was admitted to the Hackney Union Children’s Home in Homerton, London as a pauper. His father served in the London Regiment of the British Army in the First World War and was killed in action in France on 9 April 1917. Humbles lived in Hoxton, North London, during the time of his record bid. By 1936, he was living in Stoke Newington, London, where, during the same year, he married Zota Epp Mae Scarr (née McCartney, later Ribalta) (born 19 January 1919 in Hackney, London; died 30 January 2000 in Wandsworth, London). Their daughter, Sylvia June Humbles was born on 3 October 1937 at the Elizabeth Garrett Anderson Hospital in St Pancras, London, and was later adopted. In 1939, Humbles was employed fitting bicycle frames whilst living in Canonbury. Already living apart by 1945, his marriage to Zota Scarr had ended in divorce before October 1952. By 1954, he had changed his name by deed poll to Alan Alain Holt and was living in High Wycombe, Buckinghamshire, working as a painter and decorator. On 13 March 1954 at High Wycombe Register Office, he married divorcée Pamela Margaret Warren (née Sutton, later Naish) (born 19 July 1926, died 17 October 1978). Their marriage had ended in divorce by 1973. By 1977, he was living in Wood Green, London with his eldest brother, William Henry James Humbles (1903-1977). He died on 3 July 1997 in Tottenham Hale, London. His estate is included in the list of unclaimed estates maintained by the Treasury Solicitor as bona vacantia.

World endurance record
In 1911 the weekly magazine Cycling began a competition for the highest number of  rides or "centuries" in a single year. The winner was Marcel Planes with 332 centuries in which he covered . The inspiration for the competition was said to be the efforts of Harry Long, a commercial traveller who rode a bicycle on his rounds covering every part of England and Scotland and who covered  in 1910. The world record for distance cycled in a year began in an era when bicycle companies competed to show their machines were the most reliable. The record has been officially established nine times. A tenth claim, by the English rider Ken Webb, was later disallowed.

Humbles was a member of the Ingleside Cycling Club. Having been made unemployed as a blend-mixer at a tobacco factory, Humbles wanted to demonstrate that an ordinary clubman could break the long-standing world endurance record, so in 1932 cycling became a full-time occupation. 

In January 1932, he wrote to Birmingham-based cycle firm, Hercules, who agreed to give him an ordinary Hercules Empire Club racing bike from stock and eventually agreed to pay him £6 per week plus expenses to attempt the world record. He started his feat using a fixed gear and later changed to a variable gear. He suffered only four punctures and required only two new Dunlop tyres and wore out two chains during the world record attempt. At 18,000 miles all the bearings in the bike were changed, as were the brake blocks.

His average speed whilst cycling was 16 miles per hour. Having initially set off on 8 January 1932 from Marble Arch, his usual routes were out of London along the Great North Road, the Cambridge Road and the Newmarket Road. He also ventured to Brighton, Cambridge and Newbury. He later toured every county in Great Britain, visiting places such as Alnwick, Clovelly, Bury St. Edmunds and Bere Regis. He said his preferred county was Yorkshire. On 2 July 1932, he was photographed being greeted by members of the Gloucester Cycling Club on arrival in Gloucester.

On 1 October 1932, he was photographed shaking hands with a penny farthing rider as he was greeted by a group of cyclists on his arrival at Purley Station. By this stage, he had already cycled 27,000 miles.

On 11 December 1932, he set off from Buckingham Palace and broke Marcel Planes' record by riding the 34,367th mile on the 338th day through Hyde Park, London, reportedly followed by 3,000 cyclists of both sexes, including about 150 members of his own cycling club, amid prolonged cheers and the continuous ringing of 3,000 cycle bells. At Marble Arch, he was presented with a silver cup and a large laurel wreath by Sir Malcolm Campbell. Humbles’ eight year old niece, Yvonne May Ball (née Bourn; 1924-84) presented him with a small laurel wreath. After the ceremony at Marble Arch, he was escorted by a large group of cyclists, to the recently constructed Dorchester Hotel, Park Lane, London, where a reception was held in his honour, which was attended by Marcel Planes. After the reception, he set out to complete a further 100 miles that day. 

On 31 December 1932, he was photographed ending his world cycling endurance record riding through a paper clock at the New Year's Eve Reunion Carnival Dance of the National Cyclists' Union in London. By this time he had ridden 36,007 miles in 359 days.

The Golden Book
Humbles' achievements were celebrated in 1933 when Cycling Weekly awarded him his own page in the Golden Book of Cycling.

Notes

References

1910 births
Year of death missing
English male cyclists
People from Whitby
Cyclists from Yorkshire
Ultra-distance cyclists